Sex chromosome anomalies belong to a group of genetic conditions that are caused or affected by the loss, damage or addition of one or both sex chromosomes (also called gonosomes). 

In humans this may refer to:

 45, X, also known as Turner syndrome
 45,X/46,XY mosaicism
 46, XX/XY
 47, XXX, also known as Triple X syndrome and trisomy X
 47, XXY, also known as Klinefelter syndrome
 47, XYY, has normal phenotype
 48, XXXX
 48, XXXY
 48, XXYY
 49, XXXXY
 49, XXXXX
 XX gonadal dysgenesis
 XY gonadal dysgenesis
 XX male syndrome